The government of Zimbabwe is the main provider of air, rail and road services; historically, there has been little participation of private investors in transport infrastructure.

Railways 
The railway operator is National Railways of Zimbabwe.

Total: 3,427 km (2012).
Narrow gauge: 3,427 km at  gauge, 313 km of which is electrified (de-energized due to problematic power supply in 2008) (2002). 
Note: this includes the 318 km Beitbridge Bulawayo Railway company line.

Railway links with adjacent countries 

  South Africa - yes - same gauge 
  Botswana - yes - same gauge 
  Zambia - yes - same gauge 
  Mozambique - yes - same gauge

Maps 
 UN map
 UNHCR map

Stations served

Highways

There are 88,100 km of classified roads in Zimbabwe and 17,400 km of them are paved.

Primary roads

This class is sometimes called "National Roads or Highways". About 5% of the road network are primary roads. Primary roads are the most trafficked and most link neighbouring countries. One such road is the Zimbabwean portion of the Trans-African Highway as it passes through western Zimbabwe. This part of the road network plays a major role in the importation and exportation of the country's ware and transit freight. Among the primary roads some roads are classified as Regional Road Corridors, while some are just primary roads.

Regional Road Corridors are numbered R1, R2, R3 and so on. They may also be called by their original type and route name like A1, A2, A3 etc. In some cases one type "R" road may be comprise two or more type "A" routes; e.g. R2 comprises A5 and A7 (Harare-Pluntree Road). 
Ordinary primary roads are numbered P1, P2, P3 etc. These are primary roads but not convenient for cross-border traffic and services.

Regional road corridors

•	R1 = ( A4 ) (Harare-Masvingo-Beitbridge)

•	R2 = ( A5 + A7 ) (Harare-Bulawayo-Plumtree)

•	R3 = ( A1) (Harare-Chirundu)

•	R4 = ( A2 (Harare-Nyamapanda)

•	R5= (A3) (Harare-Mutare)

•	R6 = (Chivhu-Nyazura)

•	R7 = ( A17 )  (Gweru-Mvuma)

•	R8 = (Rutenga-Sango)

•	R9 = (A6 + A8 ) (Beitbridge-Bulawayo-Victoria Falls)

Source: [Map 9.2 Road Transport Network of Zimbabwe.]

Primary roads (ordinary)

•	P1 = (Harare-Mt Darwin-Mukunbura)

•	P2 = (Mt Darwin-Mukumbura) ? [Error on map]

•	P3= (Marondera-Murehwa)

       P4= (Masvingo-Mutare)
	P5= (Ngundu-Tanganda)

•	P6=   = (Chivhu-Mutare)

•	P7= (Mbalabala-Masvingo)

•	P8= (Kwekwe-Nkayi)

•	P9= (Nkayi-Lupane)

•	P10= ( Lupane loop)

•	P11= (  Kwekwe-Gokwe Highway )

•	P12= ( Makuti-Kariba)

•	P13=( Chegutu-Chinhoyi )

•	P14= ( Victoria Falls-Kazungula)

(Source: [Map 9.2 Road Transport Network of Zimbabwe.])

Secondary roads
Secondary roads make up 14% of the network in Zimbabwe. Secondary roads link the major centers within the country. These form a dependable network for the movement of both the people and goods. Some secondary roads are paved and some are gravel unlike primary roads which are all paved.

Trunk road system

The primary and secondary roads are collectively the trunk road system. The trunk road system carries 70% of the vehicular traffic. Traffic in question here is measured in vehicle kilometers. 
The trunk road system is managed by the Department of Roads.

Tertiary feeder and access roads

The roads that link rural areas to the secondary road network are called tertiary feeder and access road. 
These roads are managed by the District Development Fund (DDF) and by the Rural District Councils (RDC). 
These roads usually have traffic volumes less than 50 vehicles per day. 
Together with the unclassified roads and tracks they link rural communities to service centers, schools and health centers. These roads also provide government services to reach rural areas.

Urban roads

Urban roads make 9% of the road network. Urban roads are managed by urban councils and municipalities.

Road density in Zimbabwe

About 0.23 km per square kilometre is the road density in Zimbabwe. This is high compared with many developing countries. Only OECD countries have a substantially higher road density than Zimbabwe.

Waterways 
Waterways are not used for commercial transport; though some navigation is possible on Lake Kariba.

Pipelines 
There is a pipeline for petroleum products 270 km long. (2013)

Ports and harbours 

Binga, and Kariba are on Lake Kariba.

Airports 

196 (2013)

List of airports in Zimbabwe

Airports - with paved runways 
 total: 17
 Over 3,047 m: 3
 2,438 to 3,047 m: 2
 1,524 to 2,437 m: 5
 914 to 1,523 m: 6 (2013)

Airports - with unpaved runways 
 total: 179
 1,524 to 2,437 m: 3
 914 to 1,523 m: 104
 under 914 m: 72 (2013)

See also 
 Zimbabwe

References

External links
 UN Map, showing major transport links